The 1957 Bolivian Primera División, the first division of Bolivian football (soccer), was played in two tournaments, The Torneo Integrado and Torneo Nacional Mixto. The champions were Always Ready and Jorge Wilstermann respectively.

Torneo Nacional Mixto

Standings

Torneo Integrado

Standings

External links
 Official website of the LFPB 

Bolivian Primera División seasons
Bolivia
1957 in Bolivian sport